Langdon Abbey was a Premonstratensian abbey near West Langdon, Kent, founded in about 1192 and dissolved in 1535, reportedly the first religious house to be dissolved by Henry VIII. The visible remains of the abbey are now confined to the extensive cellaring below the 16th-century house that occupies its site and small remains of a 17th-century ice house.

Foundation
Langdon Abbey was founded in about 1192 by William de Auberville (the elder) of Westenhanger, Kent (son of Hugh de Auberville), with the assent of his wife Matilda (Maud), daughter of Ranulf de Glanville (who died at the Siege of Acre in 1190), Chief Justiciar of England to King Henry II. William de Auberville was a knight in duty to Simon de Avranches. He was also a King's Justiciar, had assisted at the foundation of the Premonstratensian abbey of Leiston, Suffolk, by his father-in-law in 1182, and was a patron of Ranulf's religious foundation at Butley Priory, Suffolk, of 1171. Langdon Abbey was founded as a daughter house of Leiston Abbey, under the hand of Robert, abbot of Leiston, and was dedicated to the Blessed Virgin Mary and St Thomas the Martyr. Sir William annexed the church of St. Mary in Walmer to the abbey, in perpetual alms, and the church remained with the abbey until its dissolution.

Patronage of Langdon descended to Nicholas de Crioll (the younger), son of William's great-granddaughter Joan de Auberville and her husband Nicholas de Crioll (the elder).

Royal favour

In 1325 Edward II recuperated at the abbey, having been taken ill on the road to Dover.

The Abbot and Convent of Langedon were granted a licence to crenellate in 1348.

In 1491 it was reported that Langdon had 300 acres (121 hectares) of grain and a very good supply of animals.

Dissolution
In 1535 the abbey was reputedly the first religious house to be dissolved by Henry VIII and had, at that time, an annual revenue estimated at £56. Dr. Leyton, the commissioner who carried out the visitation of the abbey, sent the following report to Cromwell on his arrest of the abbot and his mistress:

Later history

The fee simple ('fief') of the manor was acquired by John Master, who died in 1588. His son, James Master (who died in 1631, aged 84) was described as "Primo de Sandwich, postea de East Langden, ubi edificavit mansionem". James Master's eldest son, Sir Edward Master, was High Sheriff of Kent in 1639.

The site of the abbey itself was occupied by a farmhouse, parts of which date back to the 16th century. The monks’ cellar (retaining its original arches) remains in place underneath the house. In 1828, it was reported that the farmhouse "has been occupied many years by a respectable family of the name of Coleman", and the returns from the 1881 census show that one Richard Coleman remained a substantial farmer at Langdon as at that date.

Gallery

References

 

Premonstratensian monasteries in England
Monasteries in Kent
Dover District
Christian monasteries established in the 12th century
1190s establishments in England
Monasteries dissolved under the English Reformation